The Alpine Way is a  rural road located in the Snowy Mountains region of New South Wales, Australia. The road connects  in the east to the New South Wales / Victorian border in the west, crossing the Murray River, near Bringenbrong / Upper . The route does not carry an official shield designation.

Route
The road winds its way generally west to adjacent the Thredbo River, before heading south-west past Thredbo and then climbing & crossing the crest of the Great Dividing Range at Dead Horse Gap at an altitude of  then a winding descent to & crossing Snowy Creek @  very near the Murray River / Victorian Border. 

The highway was initially built in the 1950s as part of the access for the Snowy Mountains Scheme. However, the paving of it was only completed approximately forty years later in the 1990s.

The majority of the road is contained within the Kosciuszko National Park and since 2004 has been maintained by Roads & Maritime Services.

The road has no major intersections.

Road restrictions
Road restrictions in the region require all two-wheel drive vehicles carry snow chains between Thredbo and Tom Groggin from the long weekends marking the King's Official Birthday in June and the Labour Day in October. It is also quite possible that snow chains may be needed to drive safely along other (more dangerous) parts of Alpine Way.

See also

 List of highways in New South Wales
 1997 Thredbo landslide
 Barry Way

References

External links

Travel the Alpine Way
Snowies great drive

Highways in New South Wales
Snowy Mountains